Stanislas Lami (30 November 1858 – 31 January 1944) was a French sculptor and art historian.

Life
He was born in Paris, the son of Marie Bidauld and the sculptor Alphonse Lami. On 24 June 1891 he married Émilie, the daughter of Austrian Charles Sedelmeyer, art dealer and editor.

Works
Some of his works are on show in museums in Spain. The musée d'Orsay has his marble sculpture of a Chien danois (c.1892) – he also produced a Death-Mask of Berlioz (1884) now held at the bibliothèque de l'Opéra de Paris. He gave one of his works to his relation Charles de Gaulle. Stanislas Lami exhibited frequently at the Paris Salons, including that of 1897, and at the Chicago salon of 1893. In the end his descendants held onto the majority of his works. He died in Paris in January, 1944, aged 85.

Publications
Stanislas Lami also published an important dictionary of French sculptors, which is still the largest ever dictionary of sculptors.
Dictionnaire des sculpteurs de l'antiquité au VIe siècle de notre ère (Paris, 1884, 149 P.)
Dictionnaire des sculpteurs de l'École française du Moyen Âge au règne de Louis XIV (Paris, 1898, 584 p.)
Dictionnaire des sculpteurs de l'École française sous le règne de Louis XIV (Paris, 1906, 508 p.)
Dictionnaire des sculpteurs de l'École française au XVIIIe siècle (Paris, 1910–1911, 2 vol.)
Dictionnaire des sculpteurs de l'École française au XIXe siècle (Paris, 1914–1921, 4 vol.)

External links
 Dictionnaire des sculpteurs de l'antiquité au VIe siècle de notre ère (Paris, 1884, 149 P.)
 View at Internet Archive.
 Dictionnaire des sculpteurs de l'École française du Moyen Âge au règne de Louis XIV (Paris, 1898, 584 p.)
 View copies 1 and 2 at Internet Archive. 
 Dictionnaire des sculpteurs de l'École française au XVIIIe siècle (Paris, 1910–1911, 2 vol.)
 View vols. 1 (1910) and 2 (1911) at Gallica.
 

Artists from Paris
1858 births
1944 deaths
20th-century French sculptors
19th-century French sculptors
French male sculptors
19th-century French male artists